Askar Pervaiz is a Pakistani politician hailing from Khalid Town, Wazir Bagh, Peshawar who is currently a member of the Khyber Pakhtunkhwa Assembly belong to the Jamiat Ulema-e-Islam (F). He is also serving as the committee member of Standing Committee No 22 on Revenue Department, Standing Committee No. 14 on Industries and Technical Education Department and Standing Committee No. 06 on Auqaf, Hajj, Religious and Minority Affairs Department. Pervaiz is a young Christian politician his seat type is Reserved Seats for Minority.

References

Living people
Jamiat Ulema-e-Islam (F) politicians
People from Peshawar
Khyber Pakhtunkhwa MPAs 2013–2018
Year of birth missing (living people)